Delmar High School is a public high school in Delmar, a community in Sussex County, Delaware.

References

External links
 Delmar School District website

High schools in Sussex County, Delaware
Public high schools in Delaware
Educational institutions established in 1928
1928 establishments in Delaware